HMS Zulu was a  destroyer of the Royal Navy and the second ship to bear the name. Built in Glasgow by Alexander Stephen and Sons, her keel was laid down on 10 August 1936, she was launched on 23 September 1937 and  commissioned on 7 September 1938.

Zulu was sunk by German or Italian aircraft on 14 September 1942, off Tobruk. Some sources credit Junkers Ju 87 "Stuka" dive bombers from StG 3 with her sinking,  but the ship's commanding officer testified she was sunk by a combination of Ju 87s and Junkers Ju 88s.

Description
The Tribals were intended to counter the large destroyers being built by other nations and to improve the firepower of the existing destroyer flotillas and were significantly larger and more heavily armed than the preceding . The destroyers were powered by two Parsons geared steam turbines, each driving one propeller shaft using steam provided by three Admiralty three-drum boilers. The ships' complement consisted of 190 officers and ratings, although the flotilla leaders carried an extra 20 officers and men consisting of the Captain (D) and his staff.

The primary armament of the Tribal-class was eight quick-firing (QF) 4.7-inch (120 mm) Mark XII guns in four superfiring twin-gun mounts, one pair each fore and aft of the superstructure, designated 'A', 'B', 'X', and 'Y' from front to rear. The mounts had a maximum elevation of 40°. For anti-aircraft (AA) defence, they carried a quadruple mount for the QF two-pounder Mk II "pom-pom" gun and two quadruple mounts for the 0.5-inch (12.7 mm) Mark III machine guns. Low-angle fire for the main guns was controlled by the director-control tower (DCT) on the bridge roof that fed data acquired by it and the  rangefinder on the Mk II Rangefinder/Director directly aft of the DCT to an analogue mechanical computer, the Mk I Admiralty Fire Control Clock. Anti-aircraft fire for the main guns was controlled by the Rangefinder/Director which sent data to the mechanical Fuze Keeping Clock.

The ships were fitted with an above-water quadruple mount for  torpedoes. The Tribals were not intended as anti-submarine ships, but they were provided with ASDIC, one depth charge rack and two throwers for self-defence, although the throwers were not mounted in all ships; Twenty depth charges was the peacetime allotment, but this increased to 30 during wartime.

Wartime modifications
Heavy losses to German air attack during the Norwegian Campaign  demonstrated the ineffectiveness of the Tribals' anti-aircraft suite and the RN decided in May 1940 to replace 'X' mount with two QF  Mark XVI dual-purpose guns in a twin-gun mount. To better control the guns, the existing rangefinder/director was modified to accept a Type 285 gunnery radar as they became available. The number of depth charges was increased to 46 early in the war, and still more were added later. To increase the firing arcs of the AA guns, the rear funnel was shortened and the mainmast was reduced to a short pole mast. and two, single 2 pounder guns were mounted on the bridge wings.

Construction and career 
Authorized as one of seven Tribal-class destroyers under the 1935 Naval Estimates, Zulu was the second ship of her name to serve in the Royal Navy. The ship was ordered on 10 March 1936 from Alexander Stephen and Sons and was laid down on 27 August at the company's Linthouse shipyard. Launched on 23 September 1937, Zulu was commissioned on 6 September 1938 at a cost of £351,135 which excluded weapons and communications equipment that would be furnished by the Admiralty.

During 1940 she developed engine trouble and was dry docked for repairs and degaussing. She returned to service in early March when she was employed escorting convoys around the Western Approaches. In June 1941, she sailed to Falmouth for a refit. Following this, she was attached to Force H at Gibraltar.

On the 14 September Zulu, Sikh and  the light cruiser,  landed and covered Operation Agreement, a commando raid on Tobruk. Sikh was hit and sunk by 152 mm Italian coastal artillery, German 88 mm guns and a bomb dropped by a Macchi C.200.  115 men were killed but Zulu was able to save lives of several of her crew. Later the same day, Coventry  was heavily damaged by Junkers Ju 88s of Lehrgeschwader 1. Dead in the water, on fire and with 63 killed she was scuttled by gunfire and torpedoes from Zulu. Aircraft continued to attack Zulu and she was badly damaged and left without engine power an hour later.  According to her commanding officer, the attack was carried out by a combination of Ju 88s and Ju 87s.

The type II Hunt-class destroyer, HMS Croome came alongside to take off the surviving personnel, save for a towing party and Zulu was taken under tow by HMS Hursley.  By 19:00 hours and a hundred miles from Alexandria, it was clear she was sinking and the towing party was recovered after a strafing pass by an enemy aircraft. Soon after, Zulu rolled to starboard and sank in position . Across both attacks, twelve men were killed, twenty-seven were missing and one was wounded.

Notes

References

External links

Uboat.net
HMS Cavalier.org
HMS Zulu (F18) at Wrecksite.eu
www.Unit histories.com  White, Richard Taylor

 

Tribal-class destroyers (1936) of the Royal Navy
Ships built on the River Clyde
1937 ships
World War II destroyers of the United Kingdom
World War II shipwrecks in the Mediterranean Sea
Maritime incidents in September 1942
Destroyers sunk by aircraft
Ships sunk by German aircraft